Tangiini is a tribe of tropiduchid planthoppers in the family Tropiduchidae. There are about 10 genera and at least 30 described species in Tangiini.

Genera
These 10 genera belong to the tribe Tangiini:
 Aripoa Fennah, 1945 i c g
 Dictyotangia Fennah, 1945 i c g
 Dioxyomus Fennah, 1945 i c g
 Ladella Stål, 1859 i c g
 Ladellodes Fennah, 1965 i c g
 Neotangia Melichar, 1914 i c g
 Pelitropis Van Duzee, 1908 i c g b
 Tangella Metcalf and Bruner, 1930 i c g
 Tangia Stål, 1859 i c g
 Tangidia Uhler, 1895 i c g
Data sources: i = ITIS, c = Catalogue of Life, g = GBIF, b = Bugguide.net

References

Further reading

 
 
 
 

Tropiduchidae
Hemiptera tribes
Articles created by Qbugbot